Varmina is a monotypic moth genus in the subfamily Lymantriinae described by Frederic Moore in 1888. Its only species, Varmina indica, was first described by Francis Walker in 1855. It is found in the East Indies.

References

Lymantriinae
Monotypic moth genera